"Blipverts" is the first regular episode of the science-fiction television series Max Headroom.

Production details
"Blipverts" was the reworked version of the original 20 Minutes Into the Future film.  The only actor other than Matt Frewer to appear in both versions of the story was Amanda Pays (as Theora Jones, Edison Carter's "controller").  W. Morgan Sheppard would reprise his role as Blank Reg later on in the series (but not in this episode), making him the only other actor to have thus crossed over.  All other roles were recast, and several characters (most notably Bryce Lynch) were made far less sinister. Also, in the original film the character of Max Headroom existed as a physical hardware unit, which in the end was "stolen" by Blank Reg and his underachieving pirate network, "Big-Time TV", and went to work for them; but in "Blipverts" and for the rest of the series it was established that Max existed only as software, an independently acting computer program which escapes into the Network 23 mainframe and in the end elects to stay there.

See also
Blipvert

Max Headroom